That's How We Burn is the second full-length album by indie rock band Jaill. The album was released on Sub Pop Records on July 27, 2010, on both compact disc and vinyl formats.

Track listing

References

2010 albums
Jaill albums
Sub Pop albums